Halmenus is a genus of grasshoppers in the subfamily Cyrtacanthacridinae with species found in Galápagos Islands, Ecuador.

Species 
The following species are recognised in the genus Halmenus:
 Halmenus choristopterus Snodgrass, 1902
 Halmenus cuspidatus Snodgrass, 1902
 Halmenus eschatus Hebard, 1920
 Halmenus robustus Scudder, 1893

References 

Acrididae